Jan Mikel (born 14 April 1975) is a Czech former ice hockey defenceman.

Career 
Mikel played nine games for Vsetínská hokejová of the Czech Extraliga during the 2004–05 season. He had previously played in Italy's Serie A for SG Cortina and HC Milano Saima, the British Ice Hockey Superleague for the Ayr Scottish Eagles, the British National League for the Dundee Stars and the French Super 16 for Brest Albatros Hockey.

Mikel returned to France in 2005 with Dragons de Rouen before playing the remainder of his career in the Czech 1. Liga for HC Kometa Brno and HC Olomouc. He retired in 2012 to become a coach for Kometa Brno's U20 team.

Career statistics

References

External links

1975 births
Living people
Ayr Scottish Eagles players
Brest Albatros Hockey players
SG Cortina players
Czech ice hockey defencemen
Dragons de Rouen players
Dundee Stars players
HC Kometa Brno players
HC Olomouc players
Rochester Mustangs players
Ice hockey people from Brno
VHK Vsetín players
Czech expatriate ice hockey people
Czech expatriate sportspeople in Scotland
Czech expatriate sportspeople in France
Czech expatriate ice hockey players in the United States
Czech expatriate sportspeople in Italy
Czech expatriate ice hockey players in Canada
Expatriate ice hockey players in Scotland
Expatriate ice hockey players in France
Expatriate ice hockey players in Italy